= Swoopes Knobs =

Coordinates: 37°36′24″N 80°34′41″W

Swoopes Knobs is a ridge in the U.S. state of West Virginia.

Swoopes Knobs was named after Joseph Swope, a pioneer settler.
